The Theater Offensive is a Boston-based theatrical organization dedicated to the production of queer works. The Theater Offensive was founded in 1989 by Abraham Rybeck "to present the diversity of lesbian, gay, bisexual, and transgender lives in art so bold it breaks through personal isolation, challenges the status quo, and builds thriving communities." The Theater Offensive mounts and produces festivals and individual productions by national and local queer performers, and also serves as a development environment for new theatrical work. In addition, The Theater Offensive works to build community through education, outreach, and political activism.

The Theater Offensive has expanded throughout its history. The True Colors OUT Youth Theater troupe concentrates on producing dramatical works produced by young, queer artists. Up until the summer of 2008, its "A Street Theater Named Desire", a guerrilla AIDS activist theater troupe, enters gay cruising grounds and presents performances that promote safe sex and AIDS education. 

The Theater Offensive produces an annual Out on the Edge Festival of Queer Theater, which showcases new performing arts works by queer artists from around the world. It has been held each fall since its inception in 1992.

True Colors: Out Youth Theater, a program of The Theater Offensive and the country’s largest and longest-running lesbian, gay, bisexual, transgender and queer (LGBTQ) youth theater program, received the 2016 National Arts and Humanities Youth Program Award from First Lady Michelle Obama, for its effectiveness in promoting learning and life skills in young people through the arts by engaging them in creative youth development programming. The National Arts and Humanities Youth Program Award is the nation’s highest honor for youth arts programs, and True Colors, which was established in 1994, is the first LGBTQ organization in history to receive this award.

Awards and honors
 The National Arts and Humanities Youth Program Award, 2016 
 Bisexual and Transgender Youth (BAGLY), 2010
 Outstanding Youth Group, Hyde Square Task Force, 2010
 Valued Ally Award: Somos Latinas LGBT Coalition of Mass., 2010
 2008 Social Innovator Through the Arts from Social Innovation Forum 
 2007 Jonathan Larson Musical Theatre Award for Surviving the Nian 
 IN Newsweekly "Artist of the Year" 2006
 Improper Bostonian "Best Fringe Theater"
 Massachusetts Cultural Council Gold Star
 Gay Fathers of Greater Boston Youth Service Award, 2001
 MIT Theater Arts Playwright in Residence and Visiting Lecturer 2001-2002
 Fett Community Service Award, 2000
 Nick Norton Boston Theater Award - Special Citation, 1999
 Boston Women's Fund Take a Stand Award, 1999
 AIDS Action Committee Unsung Heroes Award, 1999
 Greater Boston Business Council Award for Individual Excellence, 1999
 City of Cambridge Peace & Justice Award, 1997
 City of Cambridge Lavender Alliance Award, 1997
 Boston Center for the Arts, Artist in Residence 1993–present
 Bessie Smith Creative Leadership Award, Boston Lesbian & Gay Political Alliance, 1989

See also
The Year We Thought About Love, a 2015 documentary film about True Colors: Out Youth Theater

References

External links
 The Theatre Offensive homepage
 The Theater Offensive Repeat Offenders
 The Theater Offensive records, 1987–2006 are located in the Northeastern University Libraries, Archives and Special Collections Department, Boston, MA.
 

Theatre companies in Boston
National Performance Network Partners
LGBT theatre in the United States
Organizations established in 1989
LGBT culture in Boston
LGBT theatre companies
1989 establishments in Massachusetts